Hatchet Lake is a remote lake in north-eastern Saskatchewan, Canada north of Wollaston Lake. From Wollaston Lake the Fond du Lac River flows through Hatchet Lake and Black Lake on its way to Lake Athabasca.

In 1963 the Hatchet Lake Lodge was constructed on Sandy Island, one of the islands near the eastern shore of Hatchet Lake.  Hatchet Lake Lodge is a fly-in fishing lodge.

The lake is served by the Hatchet Lake Airport and Hatchet Lake Water Aerodrome, both operated by the Hatchet Lake Lodge.

See also
List of lakes of Saskatchewan

References

External links
 Hatchet Lake Lodge

Lakes of Saskatchewan